Prince Ihekwoaba  (born November 9, 1989) is a Nigerian former footballer.

Career
Ihekwoaba was Canadian Soccer League champion with Serbian White Eagles FC.

Honours

Serbian White Eagles
 CSL Championship: 2008

References

1989 births
Living people
Nigerian footballers
Association football forwards
University of Nigeria alumni
Fanshawe College alumni
First Bank F.C. players
Expatriate footballers in Malaysia
Nigerian expatriates in Canada
Expatriate soccer players in Canada
Nigerian expatriates in Malaysia
Serbian White Eagles FC players
Canadian Soccer League (1998–present) players
Anambra United F.C. players